Charlotte Evans MBE (born 29 March 1991) is a British skier, sighted guide and Paralympian. She is from Chatham in Kent, and attended Rochester Grammar School and then MidKent College. She started skiing as a child at the Chatham Ski Centre, a dry ski slope, moving on to snow at the age of 14.

At the 2014 Winter Paralympic Games, as guide for visually impaired skier Kelly Gallagher, she won gold in the women's Super-G. She was appointed Member of the Order of the British Empire (MBE) in the 2014 Birthday Honours for services to Paralympic sport.

Charlotte skied with several famous people such as Fanny Chmelar.

References

Living people
British female alpine skiers
Alpine skiers at the 2014 Winter Paralympics
1991 births
Sportspeople from Chatham, Kent
Paralympic alpine skiers of Great Britain
Paralympic gold medalists for Great Britain
Paralympic sighted guides
Members of the Order of the British Empire
Medalists at the 2014 Winter Paralympics
People educated at Rochester Grammar School
Paralympic medalists in alpine skiing